NMBS/SNCB Classical twin EMUs (also referred by their construction year - AM50 for "Automotrice 1950" up to AM79 for the last units from 1979) (or MS50 to MS79 for the Dutch-language equivalent "Motorstel") are electric multiple unit trains operated by the National Railway Company of Belgium (NMBS/SNCB). They were the standard equipment for local trains under the Belgian standard 3000 Volts DC overhead lines, until gradually replaced by the Class 08 Desiro Mainline EMU's starting from the early 21st century.

Classical EMUs were originally painted in dark green, with small yellow stripes surrounding the front lights. As those were considered insufficiently visible, the front door was also painted in yellow and the stripes were enlarged.

A subset of 22 EMUs was built with stainless steel body instead of (regular) carbon steel. This remains a one shot trial as the next generations were built with carbon steel bodies.

Another subset of 6 EMUs were specifically adapted for airport service, with more space between seats and a huge luggage compartment. Although they were operated by railways staff, access was restricted to Belgian airlines travellers with a dedicated platform at Brussels Central Station. A blue paint scheme was also chosen to identify those EMUs.

In 1984, the Belgian Railways introduced a new transportation plan based on fixed-interval timetables (and the closure of many secondary passenger lines) called "Plan IC-IR." A new paint scheme was applied, based on a burgundy red color with a large white line surrounding the entire coaches or EMUs below the windows.

In 1999, classical EMUs built in the seventies were extensively refurbished, the program included comfort upgrade (interior replacement, sound system, closed circuit toilets) and repainting in the light gray livery with blue and red lines under the windows. Few units were still in the older green delivery when refurbished. The last 40 to be refurbished units received extra features (LED information displays, multi-service compartments for bicycles or standing passengers) for suburban "CityRail" service.

In 2013, a hundred non-refurbished units were scrapped, after many of the Desiro Mainline Class 08 entered into revenue service.

Technical specifications

These EMUs are driven by four 185 kW 1500 Volts DC motors. Units built before 1970 were driven by a Jeumont-Heidmann camshaft controller. After 1970, Thyristor drive were used instead.

References

External links 

 Belgian EMUs

SNCB multiple units
Electric multiple units of Belgium
3000 V DC multiple units
1500 V DC multiple units